Nai Bonet is a Vietnamese belly-dancer, singer and film actress.  Born in Saigon to a Vietnamese mother and French father, Bonet began her professional career at age 13, when she headlined as a belly-dancer in a show at the Flamingo Hotel in Las Vegas.  She began appearing in films in 1964 (frequently portraying a belly-dancer), as well as in television, commercials, variety shows, her photos adorned several album covers and she continued to appear as a night club headliner.  In 1966 she released the novelty song Jelly Belly, and she filmed a music video for the song which was featured on Scopitone video jukeboxes.

In the 1970s, Bonet decided to focus exclusively on her acting career, "But I wasn't getting anywhere in pictures," she said in 1978.  After conceiving, producing and starring in two film flops (1979's Nocturna and 1980's Hoodlums), Bonet gave up her career.

Filmography

References

External links
 

Vietnamese dancers
Living people
Vietnamese emigrants to the United States
Year of birth missing (living people)